The 2018–19 Saint Mary's Gaels men's basketball team represents Saint Mary's College of California during the 2018–19 NCAA Division I men's basketball season. The team is led by head coach Randy Bennett in his 18th season at Saint Mary's. The Gaels play their home games at the McKeon Pavilion in Moraga, California as members of the West Coast Conference. They finished the season 22-12, to finish in 2nd place. In the WCC Tournament, they defeated San Diego in the semifinals and beat Gonzaga in the championship to win the WCC Tournament. Therefore, they received a automatic bid to the NCAA Tournament where they lost in the first round to Villanova.

Previous season
The Gaels finished the 2017–18 season 30–6, 16–2 in West Coast Conference play to finish in second place. As the No. 2 seed in the WCC tournament, they defeated Pepperdine in the quarterfinals before losing to BYU in the semifinals. They were one of the last four teams not selected for the NCAA tournament and as a result earned a No. 1 seed in the National Invitation Tournament where they defeated Southeastern Louisiana in the first round and Washington in the second round before losing to Utah in the quarterfinals.

Offseason

Departures

Incoming transfers

2018 recruiting class

Roster

Schedule and results

|-
!colspan=9 style=| Non-conference regular season

|-
!colspan=9 style=| WCC regular season

|-
!colspan=9 style=| WCC tournament

|-
!colspan=9 style=| NCAA tournament

Source

References

Saint Mary's
Saint Mary's Gaels men's basketball seasons
Saint Mary's
Saint Mary's
Saint Mary's